Hovey Township is a township in far northern Armstrong County, Pennsylvania, United States. The population was 74 at the 2020 census, a decrease from the figure of 97 tabulated in 2010.

Geography
Hovey Township occupies a narrow strip of land between the Allegheny River to the east and the Butler County border to the west, ending where the river intersects the county line.

Pennsylvania Route 268 runs the length of the township along the Allegheny River, leading north  to Emlenton and south beyond Parker  to West Kittanning. Pennsylvania Route 58 crosses the township east–west, leading east across the river to Foxburg and Sligo and west via Eau Claire to Grove City.

Surrounding and adjacent neighborhoods
Hovey Township has two land borders, with Parker to the south and Allegheny Township in Butler County to the west.  Across the Allegheny River to the east, Hovey Township runs adjacent with the Clarion County neighborhoods of Richland Township, Foxburg (with a direct connection via Foxburg Bridge), and Perry Township.

Demographics

As of the census of 2000, there were 93 people, 38 households, and 25 families residing in the township. The population density was 45.3 people per square mile (17.5/km2). There were 97 housing units at an average density of 47.3/sq mi (18.3/km2). The racial makeup of the township was 97.85% White and 2.15% African American.

There were 38 households, out of which 26.3% had children under the age of 18 living with them, 63.2% were married couples living together, 2.6% had a female householder with no husband present, and 34.2% were non-families. 26.3% of all households were made up of individuals, and 5.3% had someone living alone who was 65 years of age or older. The average household size was 2.45 and the average family size was 3.00.

The township median age of 45 years was significantly more than the county median age of 40 years. The distribution by age group was 17.2% under the age of 18, 8.6% from 18 to 24, 23.7% from 25 to 44, 43.0% from 45 to 64, and 7.5% who were 65 years of age or older. The median age was 45 years. For every 100 females there were 132.5 males. For every 100 females age 18 and over, there were 120.0 males.

The median income for a household in the township was $35,938, and the median income for a family was $36,563. Males had a median income of $28,750 versus $18,750 for females. The per capita income for the township was $16,573. There were 9.5% of families and 17.9% of the population living below the poverty line, including 26.7% of under eighteens and none of those over 64.

History
Hovey Township appears in the 1876 Atlas of Armstrong County, Pennsylvania.

References

Populated places established in 1797
Townships in Armstrong County, Pennsylvania